Make It Happen may refer to:

Film and television
Make It Happen (film), a 2008 American dance film
"Make It Happen" (Wizards of Waverly Place), a 2009 television episode

Music

Albums
Make It Happen (Nizlopi album), 2008
Make It Happen (Smokey Robinson and the Miracles album), 1967
Make It Happen (EP), by Rock N Roll Hi Fives, 2014
Make It Happen, an EP by the Tough Alliance, 2004

Songs
"Make It Happen" (Mariah Carey song), 1991
"Make It Happen" (Electronic song), 1999
"Make It Happen", by Blue from All Rise, 2001
"Make It Happen", by Namie Amuro from Checkmate!, 2011
"Make It Happen", by Rüfüs Du Sol from Surrender, 2021
"Make It Happen", by the Teenagers from Reality Check, 2008